Surinamese Dutch is the form of Dutch spoken in Suriname and is the official language in Suriname, a former Dutch colony. Dutch is spoken as a native language by about 80% of the population, most of them being bilingual with Sranan Tongo, Hindustani, Javanese, and other languages. Nevertheless, Dutch is the sole official language of the country. Surinamese Dutch is easily intelligible with other forms of Dutch. Furthermore, as opposed to other languages that have different forms in the Americas (e.g., American English vs. British English) the regulation and thus standardised spelling of the Dutch language is done through a joint Dutch-Belgian-Surinamese organization, the Dutch Language Union, and thus has no regional differences regarding spelling. Suriname has been an associate member of this Nederlandse Taalunie since 2005. Therefore, many typical Surinamese words were added to the official Wordlist of Standard Dutch, known as "the Green Booklet" (Groene Boekje).

Surinamese Dutch is generally easily distinguishable from other standardized forms of Dutch due to the accent and some loanwords adopted from other languages spoken in Suriname.

Phonology
In Surinamese Dutch, the voiced fricatives  have completely merged into the voiceless fricatives .

History
Dutch was introduced in what is now Suriname when Paramaribo and its environs became a Dutch colony. The remainder of Suriname, however, remained in British hands. Only after the Dutch had lost New Netherland (now New York) to the British did they in exchange receive the rest of Suriname. Then, Dutch became the language of communication between Native Surinamese, African slaves, and the Dutch colonial administration. In 1876, the language also became official in the Surinamese education system, and new immigrants from British India and the Dutch East Indies also picked up the language. The immigrants also added features to spoken Dutch that are not present in the original European variants of Dutch.

References

Sources
 

Languages of Suriname
Dutch language in the Americas